David J. Buck is a retired lieutenant general in the United States Air Force. Prior to his retirement on February 1, 2018, Buck served as the commander of the 14th Air Force, Air Force Space Command, and the Joint Force Space Component at Vandenberg Air Force Base.

Air Force career
David Buck graduated summa cum laude with a degree in business administration from Kansas Newman College. In 1986, he graduated from Air Force Officer Training School, and commissioned as a second lieutenant.  From 1986 to 1991, he served as a missile combat crew commander at Ellsworth Air Force Base.  He then served in the 576th Flight Test Squadron at Vandenberg Air Force Base, Headquarters Air Force Space Command at Peterson Air Force Base,  and attended the College of Naval Command and Staff.  He commanded the 1st Space Launch Squadron at Cape Canaveral Air Force Station and the 821st Air Base Group at Thule Air Base. He then served as the vice commander of the 30th Space Wing and the commander of the 50th Space Wing.  In 2010, Buck deployed for a year to direct Air Force Central Command space forces in southwest Asia. After serving as the vice command of the Air Force Warfare Center at Nellis Air Force Base, he served as the Director of Operation and the Vice Commander for Air Force Space Command.  In August 2015, he assumed command of the 14th Air Force, Air Force Space Command, and the Joint Force Space Component.  He retired on February 1, 2018.

Awards and decorations

Effective dates of promotion

References

 
 

 
 

 

Living people
United States Air Force generals
Year of birth missing (living people)